HMS Fury was an F-class destroyer built for the Royal Navy in the 1930s. Although assigned to the Home Fleet upon completion, the ship was attached to the Mediterranean Fleet in 1935–36 during the Abyssinia Crisis. During the Spanish Civil War of 1936–1939, she spent time in Spanish waters, enforcing the arms blockade imposed by Britain and France on both sides of the conflict. The ship escorted the larger ships of the fleet during the early stages of World War II and played a minor role in the Norwegian Campaign of 1940. Fury was sent to Gibraltar in mid-1940 and formed part of Force H where she participated in the attack on Mers-el-Kébir and the Battle of Dakar. The ship escorted numerous convoys to Malta in 1940–41 and Arctic convoys during 1942.

Fury was briefly transferred to the Mediterranean in August 1942 to participate in Operation Pedestal but returned to the Home Fleet immediately afterwards to resume her role screening convoys to Russia. She continued in this role until March 1943 when she began escorting convoys in the North Atlantic for several months. The ship was transferred to the Mediterranean Fleet a few months later as the Allies began making landings in Italian territory in mid-1943. Later in the year, she participated in the Dodecanese Campaign in the Aegean where she helped to sink a German troop convoy. Fury returned to the Home Fleet in mid-1944 in preparation for Operation Neptune, the Allied invasion of France. The ship provided naval gunfire support during the landings until she struck a mine during a storm on 21 June and was then blown ashore. She was deemed uneconomical to repair and scrapping began in September.

Description
The F-class ships were repeats of the preceding E class. They were powered by two Parsons geared steam turbines, each driving one propeller shaft, using steam provided by three Admiralty three-drum boilers. The ships' complement was 145 officers and ratings.

The ships mounted four 4.7-inch (120 mm) Mark IX guns in single mounts in single mounts, designated 'A', 'B', 'X', and 'Y' in sequence from front to rear. For anti-aircraft (AA) defence, they had two quadruple Mark I mounts for the 0.5 inch Vickers Mark III machine gun. The F class was fitted with two above-water quadruple torpedo tube mounts for  torpedoes. One depth charge rack and two throwers were fitted; 20 depth charges were originally carried, but this increased to 35 shortly after the war began.

Wartime modifications

Between October 1940 and April 1941, Fury had her rear torpedo tube mount replaced by a 12-pounder (76 mm) AA gun. During her early 1942 refit, two single  Oerlikon light AA guns were installed abreast the bridge. By July 1942, a Type 286 short-range surface-search radar was fitted as was a HF/DF radio direction finder mounted on a pole mainmast. By February 1943 photographic evidence shows that a pair of Oerlikons had replaced her Vickers .50 machine guns. During her early 1944 refit, another pair of Oerlikons was added and her 12-pounder gun was removed. Photos taken of the ship in July 1944 show her with a Type 271 radar mounted on her searchlight platform that was probably installed during her last refit.

Construction and career
Fury was built by J. Samuel White at its Cowes shipyard under the 1932 Naval Programme. The ship was laid down on 19 May 1933, launched on 10 September 1934, as the eleventh ship to carry the name, and completed on 18 April 1935. The ship cost 248,538 pounds, excluding Admiralty supplied equipment such as armaments and communications sets. Fury was initially assigned to the 6th Destroyer Flotilla (DF) of the Home Fleet, but was sent to reinforce the Mediterranean Fleet, together with most of her sister ships, during the Abyssinian crisis in June. On 11 December 1936, the day after his abdication broadcast to the nation, Fury embarked The Duke of Windsor for passage to Boulogne-sur-Mer. After returning home, she remained there aside from deployments to Spanish waters to enforce the arms embargo imposed on both sides in the Spanish Civil War by the Non-Intervention Committee. The flotilla was renumbered the 8th Destroyer Flotilla in April 1939, five months before the start of World War II. Fury remained assigned to it until June 1940, escorting the larger ships of the fleet and conducting anti-submarine patrols.

On 15 September, Fury was one of the destroyers that relieved her sisters escorting the aircraft carrier  after they had sunk the  after it attacked the carrier. Two months later, she was escorting the battleship  when the latter struck a magnetic mine as they were entering Loch Ewe on 4 December. Fury remained there for a time in case any further mining attempts were made. In February 1940, she was one of the escorts for Convoy TC 3 carrying troops from Canada to the UK. On 17 April, Fury screened the damaged heavy cruiser  as she returned to Scapa Flow after bombarding the airbase at Stavanger, Norway.

Glorious was detached to refuel at Scapa Flow on the 27th and was escorted by Fury and seven other destroyers. Three days later, she screened the battleship  as the latter rendezvoused with Ark Royal. On 9 May, Fury, her sister , and three other destroyers were detached from the escort of the battlecruiser  in an attempt to intercept a German force of E-boats that was expected. Other forces searching for German minelayers nearby also failed to locate their quarry. The destroyer  came up to assist and towed Kelly most of the way to Hebburn, escorted by Fury, Kandahar and the destroyer .

Force H, 1940–1941
On 29 June, Fury sailed from Scapa to Gibraltar to join her sisters of the 8th DF as the escorts for Force H. On 3 July she took part in the attack on the French Fleet at Mers-el-Kébir (Operation Catapult). In late August the ship escorted Valiant and the new carrier  from the UK to Gibraltar. The next day, Fury and Force H covered the passage of Valiant and Illustrious through the Western Mediterranean to rendezvous with the Mediterranean Fleet (Operation Hats). On 13 September, Force H rendezvoused with a convoy that was carrying troops intended to capture Dakar from the Vichy French. Ten days later, they attacked Dakar, but were driven off by the Vichy French defences. During the battle on 24 September, Fury, the destroyer , and the heavy cruiser  engaged the Vichy French destroyer  which was set on fire and forced to beach itself. In early October, Fury escorted a troop convoy from Freetown, Sierra Leone, to French Cameroon.

The ship escorted the carriers  and Ark Royal during Operations Coat and White in November. Fury escorted Force F to Malta during Operation Collar later in the month and participated in the inconclusive Battle of Cape Spartivento on 27 November, where she was part of the screen for the battlecruiser  and the battleship . In January 1941, the ship screened Force H during Operation Excess. At the end of the month, Force H departed Gibraltar to carry out Operation Picket, an unsuccessful night torpedo attack by eight of Ark Royals Fairey Swordfish on the Tirso Dam in Sardinia. The British ships returned to Gibraltar on 4 February and began preparing for Operation Grog, a naval bombardment of Genoa, that was successfully carried out five days later. The following month Fury underwent a brief refit at Malta. Her sister  was ordered to board and capture Bangkok, but she was thwarted by gunfire from a coast-defence battery off the port of Nemours, Algeria. A few days later, Fury and four other destroyers escorted Sheffield, Renown, and Ark Royal in Operation Winch, which delivered a dozen Hurricane fighters to Malta. Beginning on 24 April, Fury and Force H covered Argus flying off more Hurricanes as well as the destroyers of the 5th Destroyer Flotilla sailing to Malta.

This was part of Operation Tiger which included a supply convoy taking tanks to the Middle East and the transfer of warships. Fury and her sisters had their Two-Speed Destroyer Sweep (TSDS) minesweeping gear rigged to allow them to serve as fast minesweepers en route to Malta. Despite this, one merchant ship was sunk by mines and another damaged. Later that month, she participated in Operation Splice, another mission in which the carriers Ark Royal and  flew off fighters for Malta. Heavy seas increased fuel consumption for all of the escorts and Forester was forced to return to Gibraltar to refuel later that day before rejoining the capital ships of Force H on 29 May, after Bismarck had been tracked down and sunk. In early June the destroyer participated in two more aircraft delivery missions to Malta (Operations Rocket and Tracer). On 22 June, the 8th DF was tasked to intercept a German supply ship spotted heading towards the French coast. The next day they intercepted  which was scuttled by her crew upon the approach of the British ships. They rescued 78 British POWs taken from ships sunk by German raiders and the crew. In late June, Fury screened Ark Royal and Furious as they flew off more fighters for Malta in Operation Railway.

Another Malta convoy (Operation Substance) was conducted in mid-July, heavily escorted by Force H and elements of the Home Fleet and another in early August (Operation Style), albeit with only Force H covering the convoy. Several weeks later, Fury participated in Operation Mincemeat, during which Force H escorted a minelayer to Livorno to lay its mines while Ark Royals aircraft attacked Northern Sardinia as a diversion. In late September, the destroyer escorted another convoy to Malta in Operation Halberd.

Arctic Waters 1942–1943

Fury was transferred home in October and briefly joined the Greenock Special Escort Division. By December she had rejoined the 8th DF of the Home Fleet and began a refit in a Humber shipyard. On 15 February 1942 she rejoined the 8th Flotilla at Scapa Flow for service with the Russian convoys. In March Fury escorted the covering force for Convoy QP 6 and Convoy PQ 12. The Germans spotted the destroyer force and delayed Tirpitzs sailing date to avoid them. Fury and the destroyer  escorted Convoy PQ 13 beginning on 23 March, later reinforced by the light cruiser . A severe storm from 25 to 27 March caused the convoy to scatter and the escorts were detailed to find the stragglers and reassemble the convoy. Fury had to find and refuel the converted whaler Sumba in response to her message that she was low on fuel and found the merchantman  en route as she rejoined the convoy the next day. Trinidad fired one torpedo at Z26, but it circled around and struck the cruiser. Fury pursued her until they encountered the convoy and Fury turned back to screen Trinidad after firing two salvoes by mistake at Eclipse. Fury then escorted Trinidad into the Kola Inlet where they arrived the following morning.

Fury remained in Murmansk until 10 March, when she screened Convoy QP 10 through to Iceland. She escorted the distant cover force of the Home Fleet as Trinidad attempted to sail home from Murmansk in mid-May, but the cruiser was sunk en route by German bombers. Fury then was a part of the screen of Home Fleet as it provided distant cover for Convoys PQ 16 and QP 12 later in the month. The ship was assigned as part of the close escort for Convoy QP 17 at the end of June.

Fury returned to the Mediterranean in early August, and was one of the close escorts of Force X for Operation Pedestal in mid-August. As the convoy passed through the Sicilian Narrows between Tunisia and Sicily, the ship used her TSDS gear to sweep for mines. Fury then escorted the damaged Nelson back to the UK for repairs.

On 9 September 1942 she joined the escort for Convoy PQ 18, but was detached from it on 17 September to escort the returning Convoy QP 14. The ship was given a brief refit on the Humber in November before resuming convoys to Russia. The following month, Fury escorted the Convoys JW 51A and RA 51 to and from Murmansk then Convoy RA 53 in February 1943.

1943–1944
In mid-March recent successes by U-boats caused the Admiralty to transfer destroyers from the Home Fleet to escort duties in the North Atlantic. Fury was one of these and was assigned to the 4th Escort Group. In April the group escorted Convoys HX 231, HX 234 and ONS 5 (where they drove off attacking U-boat wolfpacks). In May she escorted ON 184 before beginning a brief refit on the Humber.

On 17 June, Fury escorted Home Fleet units to reinforce the Mediterranean Fleet for the Sicily landings. On 10 July she formed part of the covering force for the landings. A week later, she was part of the covering force for the landings at Salerno. After the surrender of Italy, Fury was one of the ships that escorted units of the Italian Fleet into Malta for their surrender and then to Alexandria, Egypt, arriving on 17 September.

A few days later, the ship was assigned to support Allied forces in the Dodecanese Campaign. On 20–21 September, she loaded  of supplies and 340 men of the Queen's Own Royal West Kent Regiment at Haifa, Palestine, to reinforce the British garrison on Leros. On the morning of 7 October, they encountered a small convoy south of Levitha. The cruisers sank the escorting trawler Uj 2111 while the destroyers sank the 5,216-GRT freighter ; all of the ships engaged the barges at very short range and sank six of the seven. As the ships withdrew, they were repeatedly attacked by German aircraft which damaged Penelope. On the night of 15/16 November she bombarded Leros with the destroyers  and  On 29 November, Fury helped to escort the recently torpedoed Birmingham to Alexandria.

In December she was converted at Gibraltar for use as a convoy escort in a refit that lasted until February 1944. Upon its completion, the ship rejoined the 8th DF in the Mediterranean for several months before rejoining the Home Fleet where they arrived on 11 May. After several weeks of training in preparation for her role as a shore bombardment ship during the Normandy landings, Fury sailed from Scapa to Portsmouth on 26 May. The ship was assigned to Bombardment Force E, supporting Juno Beach and the 3rd Canadian Infantry Division and No. 48 (Royal Marine) Commando assaulting the beach.

Fury and Faulknor left the Solent on 5 June as the escort for the minesweepers of Convoy J-1. She arrived at the beachhead and took up her bombardment position on 6 June where, along with Faulknor and the destroyers ,  and the Free French-manned La Combattante, she carried out a preliminary bombardment of the area west of Courseulles and then gunfire support as requested. The ship returned to Portsmouth periodically to reammunition and resupply as needed.

At 10:38 on the morning of 21 June, Fury detonated a ground mine off Juno Beach during a gale and the navy decided to tow her into the British Mulberry harbour at Arromanches where her damage could be evaluated. While waiting for a tugboat, she took on a 6° list to starboard from flooding. The Dutch tug Thames began towing the ship at 13:25; at 21:14, Fury accidentally collided with the stern of a freighter anchored outside the Mulberry, damaging her port side above the waterline, and the towline snapped at 21:49 when she struck another ship several times. She let go her anchor after drifting clear, but it almost immediately started dragging under the pressure of the wind and waves and the salvage ship Lincoln Salvor was secured alongside to steady Fury. Another tug made a towline fast at 22:18, but it immediately snapped when the tug began to pull forward. Lincoln Salvor had to cast off as her wooden hull was being damaged by slamming into Furys hull and six other tugboats attempted to tow the destroyer clear of the shipping in the Mulberry, but they all failed. Fury struck at least three other ships, including petrol and ammunition ships before she was driven ashore at 01:30. Her crew was able to walk to Arromanches at about 05:30 once the tide went out.

She was subsequently refloated on 5 July and towed back to the UK. The subsequent survey declared her a constructive total loss, and the ship was sold to Thos. W. Ward by BISCO. Fury was towed to Briton Ferry to be scrapped, arriving there on 18 September 1944.

References

Bibliography

External links

 HMS Furys career
 HMS Fury at Uboat.net

 

E and F-class destroyers of the Royal Navy
Ships built on the Isle of Wight
1934 ships
World War II destroyers of the United Kingdom
Maritime incidents in June 1944